Sebastiano Baldini (1615–1685) was a satirical Roman poet, librettist for almost every composer operating in Rome at that time, and a secretary to a series of cardinals. The most important was Flavio Chigi. For his literary qualities and for his good humor he was well received by the aristocracy and Roman cultural circles. Christina, Queen of Sweden, based a scenario on one of his poems, and Alessandro Stradella based his 1677 serenata Il Damone on it.

He was a member of various academies, including those of literary humorists in Rome and Pesaro (founded in 1645). Baldini was drawn by Pier Francesco Mola.

Bibliography
 Giorgio Morelli: Sebastiano Baldini. Le poesie per musica nei codici della Biblioteca Apostolica Vaticana, Rome, Istituto di bibliografia musicale, 2000,

References

Italian poets
Italian male poets
Italian librettists
1615 births
1685 deaths
Writers from Rome